The Generation 3 refers to the generation of stock cars used in NASCAR from 1981 to 1991, and it was used in the Busch Series until 1992. In this generation, NASCAR downsized the cars to better resemble cars on the showroom floor (with wheelbase at 110 inches), and body panels were still purchased through the manufacturers.

History

Cup Series 
The Generation 3 era began in 1981 and, as a sequence of the second aero war between General Motors and Ford that also extended to their production models, featured bigger spoilers, and streamlined designs that barely resembled their showroom counterparts. The wheelbase was reduced to 110 inches in response to the demand of the production car market at the time, making the cars smaller than the previous two generations.

These were the cars that necessitated restrictor plates at Daytona and Talladega. But soon into the race, Bobby Allison's car went airborne and nearly went into the main grandstands, and that was the last unrestricted race on either of the two giant tracks. NASCAR mandated smaller carburetors for the rest of that season, and in 1988 required the restrictor plates.

The Generation 3 cars were used until 1991. It was the last generation without roof flaps (mandated in 1994). It was succeeded by the Generation 4 cars in 1992. In that same year, the Generation 3 car was still used in the Busch Series, until the series adopted their Generation 4 car in 1993.

Busch Series 
In 1982, NASCAR's then-new second-tier series (currently known as the NASCAR Xfinity Series) competitors began looking at alternatives from the 5-litre based ( engines, as in short track racing there was a push for six-cylinder engines in short track racing to save on costs, with some series allowing weight breaks.  One popular idea was to use  six-cylinder engines; instead of Cup Series'  V-8s. In 1989, NASCAR changed rules requiring cars to use current body styles, similar to the Cup cars. However, the cars still used V6 engines. The cars gradually became similar to Cup cars.

Models

General Motors 

 

 Buick Regal: 1981–1985, 1988–1991
 Buick LeSabre: 1986–1987
 Chevrolet Lumina: 1989–1991
 Chevrolet Monte Carlo: 1981–1989
 Oldsmobile Cutlass: 1981–1991
 Oldsmobile Delta 88: 1986–1987
 Pontiac Grand Prix: 1981-1991
 Pontiac LeMans: 1982-1983

Ford Motor Company 

 Ford Thunderbird: 1981–1991

Chrysler Corporation 

 Chrysler Cordoba: 1980
 Dodge Mirada: 1981-1986
 Imperial: 1981-1986

See also 
 Cup Series cars

References

External links 

NASCAR Cup Series
1980s in NASCAR
Vehicles introduced in 1981
1991 endings